The British Academy Television Craft Awards of 2007 are presented by the British Academy of Film and Television Arts (BAFTA) and were held on 22 April 2007 at The Dorchester, Mayfair, the ceremony was hosted by Jon Snow.

Winners and nominees
Winners will be listed first and highlighted in boldface.

Special awards
 Sydney Lotterby

See also
 2007 British Academy Television Awards

References

External links
British Academy Craft Awards official website

2007 television awards
2007 in British television
2007 in London
April 2007 events in the United Kingdom
2007